The Man is the fifth studio album by alternative rock band Sponge. Vocalist Vinnie Dombroski is the only original band member left on this recording. Sponge producer Tim Patalan's brother Andy, along with fellow Solid Frog bandmate Kyle Neely, assumed guitar duties for this album.

Track listing
All songs written by Vinnie Dombroski except where noted.

Band members
Vinnie Dombroski - vocals/strings on "Unlucky"
Billy Adams - drums
Tim Krukowski - bass/strings on "Unlucky"
Kyle Neely - guitar
Andy Patalan - guitar

Additional personnel
Danielle Arsenault - background vocals on "The Man"
Tim Palmer - mixing on "Fame and Glory" and "Glue"
Erv Karwelis - Executive producer
Tim Pak - mastering
Vinnie Dombroski - photography
Mark Arminski - cover layout and design
Mike Rand - Booking agent
Shelia Taylor - website support
Doug Podell - special guidance and counseling
Mike "Pidge" Pigeon - Tour manager

References

2005 albums
Sponge (band) albums